Phanerochaete allantospora is a plant pathogen infecting Platanus species.

References

Fungal tree pathogens and diseases
allantospora
Fungi described in 1974